The following outline is provided as an overview of and topical guide to Bermuda:

Bermuda – a British overseas territory located in the North Atlantic Ocean.  Located off the east coast of the United States, it is situated around 1770 km (1,100 mi) northeast of Miami, Florida, and 1350 km (840 mi) south of Halifax, Nova Scotia, Canada. The nearest landmass is Cape Hatteras, North Carolina, about 1030 km (640 mi) west-northwest. Bermuda is the oldest and most populous remaining British overseas territory, having been settled by English forces a century before the Acts of Union created the Kingdom of Great Britain.  Bermuda has a highly affluent economy, with a large financial sector and tourism industry giving it the world's highest GDP per capita in 2005. It has a subtropical climate, beaches with pink sand, and cerulean blue ocean.

General reference

 Pronunciation:
 Common English country names:  Bermuda or the Bermuda Islands
 Official English country name: Bermuda Islands
 Common endonym(s):  
 Official endonym(s):  
 Adjectival(s): Bermudian 
 Demonym(s):
 ISO country codes: BM, BMU, 060
 ISO region codes: See ISO 3166-2:BM
 Internet country code top-level domain: .bm

Geography of Bermuda 

Geography of Bermuda
 Bermuda is: a British overseas territory, consisting of approximately 138 islands
 Location:
 Northern Hemisphere and Western Hemisphere
 North America, off the East Coast of the United States
 Atlantic Ocean
 North Atlantic
 Time zone:  Atlantic Standard Time (UTC-04), Atlantic Daylight Time (UTC-03)
 Extreme points of Bermuda
 Highest:  Town Hill 
 Lowest:  North Atlantic Ocean 0 m
 Northernmost:  Fort St. Catherine 32°23'27.5"N
 Southernmost:  Unnamed headland between Boat Bay and Sinky Bay 32°14'48.9"N (although there are reefs and skerries that lie farther south, it is debatable as to whether these are "land").
 Westernmost: Islet off Wreck Hill Estate 64°53'15.2"W
 Easternmost: Prominent but unnamed skerry east of Annie's Bay 64°38'47.4"W (not counting reefs that lie somewhat farther east)
 Land boundaries:  none
 Coastline:  103 km
 Population of Bermuda: 66,163(2007) - 205th most populous country
 Area of Bermuda:  - 224th largest country
 Atlas of Bermuda

Environment of Bermuda 

 Climate of Bermuda
 Environmental issues in Bermuda
 Renewable energy in Bermuda
 Geology of Bermuda
 Protected areas of Bermuda
 Biosphere reserves in Bermuda
 National parks of Bermuda
 Wildlife of Bermuda
 Flora of Bermuda
 Fauna of Bermuda
 Birds of Bermuda
 Mammals of Bermuda
 Energy in Bermuda

Natural geographic features of Bermuda 

 Fjords of Bermuda
 Glaciers of Bermuda
 Islands of Bermuda
 Lakes of Bermuda
 Mountains of Bermuda
 Volcanoes in Bermuda
 Rivers of Bermuda
 Waterfalls of Bermuda
 Valleys of Bermuda
 World Heritage Sites in Bermuda

Regions of Bermuda 

Regions of Bermuda

Ecoregions of Bermuda 

List of ecoregions in Bermuda

Administrative divisions of Bermuda 

Administrative divisions of Bermuda (9 Parishes)

Municipalities of Bermuda 

Municipalities of Bermuda
 Capital of Bermuda: Hamilton
 Cities of Bermuda

Demography of Bermuda 

Demographics of Bermuda

Government and politics of Bermuda 

Politics of Bermuda
 Form of government: parliamentary representative democratic dependency
 Capital of Bermuda: Hamilton
 Elections in Bermuda
 Political parties in Bermuda

Branches of government

Government of Bermuda

Executive branch of the government of Bermuda 
 Head of state: Monarch of the United Kingdom, King Charles III
 Monarch's representative: Governor of Bermuda
 Head of government: Premier of Bermuda
 Cabinet of Bermuda - its 14 members are selected by the Premier from among members of the bicameral parliament
 Premier: Hon. Craig Cannonier
 Minister of Tourism: Ewart Brown
 Minister of Transport: Ewart Brown
 Minister of Finance: Paula A Cox
 Minister of Health & Family Services: Michael Scott
 Minister of Justice: Philip Perinchief
 Minister of Labour Home Affairs and Public Safety: K H Randolph Horton
 Minister of Education: Terry E Lister
 Minister of the Environment: Neletha I Butterfield
 Minister of Community Affairs & Sport: Dale D Butler
 Minister of Works & Engineering: David Burch
 Minister of Housing: David Burch
 Minister of National Drug Control: Wayne Perinchief
 Minister without Portfolio: Walter Lister

Legislative branch of the government of Bermuda 

 Parliament of Bermuda (bicameral)
 Upper house: Senate of Bermuda - its 11 seats are appointed by the Governor
 Lower house: House of Assembly of Bermuda

Judicial branch of the government of Bermuda 

Court system of Bermuda
 Supreme Court of Bermuda

Foreign relations of Bermuda 

Foreign relations of Bermuda
 Diplomatic missions in Bermuda
 Diplomatic missions of Bermuda

International organization membership 
The government of the Bermuda Islands is a member of:
Caribbean Community and Common Market (Caricom) (associate)
International Criminal Police Organization (Interpol) (subbureau)
International Olympic Committee (IOC)
International Trade Union Confederation (ITUC)
Universal Postal Union (UPU)
World Customs Organization (WCO)
World Federation of Trade Unions (WFTU)

Law and order in Bermuda 

Law of Bermuda
 Constitution of Bermuda
 Crime in Bermuda
 Human rights in Bermuda
 LGBT rights in Bermuda
 Freedom of religion in Bermuda
 Law enforcement in Bermuda

Military of Bermuda 

Military of Bermuda
 Command
 Commander-in-chief:
 Ministry of Defence of Bermuda
 Forces
 Army of Bermuda
 Navy of Bermuda
 Air Force of Bermuda
 Special forces of Bermuda
 Military history of Bermuda
 Military ranks of Bermuda

Local government in Bermuda 

Local government in Bermuda

History of Bermuda 

History of Bermuda
 List of Bermuda Triangle incidents
 Bermuda Admiralty Case
 Bermuda Militia 1612–1687
 Bermuda Militia 1687–1813
 Bermuda Militia 1813
 Bermuda Militias 1612–1815
 Hurricane Fabian
 Royal Air Force, Bermuda (1939–1945)
 Sea Venture
 George Somers
 Somers Isles Company
 Thomas Gates (governor)
 USN Submarine Base, Ordnance Island, Bermuda
 London Company

Culture of Bermuda 

Culture of Bermuda
 Architecture of Bermuda
 Cuisine of Bermuda
 Languages of Bermuda
 National symbols of Bermuda
 Coat of arms of Bermuda
 Flag of Bermuda
 National anthem of Bermuda
 People of Bermuda
 Public holidays in Bermuda
 Religion in Bermuda
 Christianity in Bermuda
 Anglican Church of Bermuda
 Hinduism in Bermuda
 Islam in Bermuda

Art in Bermuda 

 Music of Bermuda
 Television in Bermuda

Sports in Bermuda 

Sports in Bermuda
 Basketball in Bermuda
 Bermuda national basketball team
 Football in Bermuda
 Bermuda national football team
 Bermuda National Stadium
 Bermuda at the Olympics
 Bermuda at the 1976 Summer Olympics
 Bermuda at the 1988 Summer Olympics
 Bermuda at the 2000 Summer Olympics
 Bermuda at the 2004 Summer Olympics
 Bermuda at the 2006 Winter Olympics

Economy and infrastructure of Bermuda 

Economy of Bermuda
 Economic rank, by nominal GDP (2007):
 Communications in Bermuda
 Internet in Bermuda
 Postage stamps and postal history of Bermuda
 Companies of Bermuda
 Financial sector of Bermuda
 Bermuda Monetary Authority
Currency of Bermuda: Dollar
 Former currency: Bermudian pound
ISO 4217: BMD
 Bermuda Stock Exchange
 Transport in Bermuda
 Air transport in Bermuda
 Airlines of Bermuda
 Airports in Bermuda
 Bermuda International Airport
 Rail transport in Bermuda

Education in Bermuda 

Education in Bermuda
List of schools in Bermuda

See also 

Bermuda

Index of Bermuda-related articles
List of Bermuda-related topics
List of international rankings
Outline of geography
Outline of North America
Outline of the United Kingdom

References

External links

 General
Bermuda. The World Factbook. Central Intelligence Agency.
Bermuda Online (directory of 120+ Bermuda-related websites)

 Geography
Bermuda National Trust, a body dedicated to the preservation of historic and environmental sites of interest, including several museums.
Large map of Bermuda

 Government
Bermuda Government (official government website)
 
US State Department page on Bermuda
U.S. Consulate General(U.S. State Department website)

 History
Bermuda's role in the War of 1812, chronicles Bermuda's little-known role in the American War of 1812

 Economy and business
Association of Bermuda International Companies.

 Media
US Department of State Post Report for Bermuda.
Bermuda Sun, a twice-weekly newspaper.
The Royal Gazette, a daily newspaper, published since 1828.

 Travel and transport
Bermuda Dept. of Tourism (Bermuda Government website)
Bermuda International Airport official website
Bermuda Maritime Museum, a maritime museum housed in the historic Dockyard, dedicated to public education and historical, archaeological and heritage research.
Roots Web: Ships of Bermuda (genealogy resource)

Bermuda